Hertha BSC's 2006–07 season began on 16 July, with their UEFA Intertoto Cup match against FC Moscow, and ended on 19 May, with their Bundesliga match against Eintracht Frankfurt. They were one of 11 winners of the UEFA Intertoto Cup. In the UEFA Cup, and in the DFB-Ligapokal they were eliminated in the first round. They made it as far as the quarter-finals of the DFB-Pokal, and finished tenth in the Bundesliga.

Players

First-team squad
Squad at end of season

Transfers

Summer

In:

Out:

Winter

In:

Out:

Statistics

Goalscorers

Results

Intertoto Cup

Third round

DFB-Ligapokal

First round

UEFA Cup

Second qualifying round

First round

DFB-Pokal

First round

Second round

Third round

Quarterfinal

Bundesliga

References

Notes

Hertha BSC seasons
Hertha Bsc